The Black Sluice is the name given to the structure that controls the flow of the South Forty-Foot Drain into The Haven, at Boston, Lincolnshire, England.

History and ownership
The original Black Sluice was probably the Skirbeck Sluice where Earl of Lindsey's 1635 attempt to drain what was then called the Lindsey Levels ran to the sea. The ensuing battle with the population left the works destroyed, and this seems to be the origin of the name Black Sluice.  The name became associated with the area drained by the original 40 foot drain, and has been used for each successive outfall from the area, and for the name of the authority responsible for the drainage. Created in 1765 the Black Sluice Commissioners are succeeded today by the Black Sluice Internal Drainage Board and a range of interlocking boards and authorities: The Witham and Steeping Rivers Catchment Board, Lincolnshire River Board. National Rivers Authority, and now the Environment Agency.

There have been at least three Black Sluices, the latest of which incorporates the pumping station built in 1946.

The lock
The lock which gave passage past the Black Sluice fell into disrepair after the second world war, but was restored to full operation in 2008 as part of the Fens Waterways Link scheme to improve navigation through the fens for pleasure craft. A formal opening of the lock was held on 20 March 2009.

Black Sluice Lock is not permanently manned, so bookings for transit will need to be made a minimum of 24 hours in advance.

There is a small visitors centre at the new Lock.

See also
South Forty-Foot Drain for considerable detail about the various sluices.
The Forty Foot drains in Lincolnshire
Fens Waterways Link
River Witham
Cornelius Vermuyden

References

External links
Newspaper report of lock re-opening
Geographs of the Black Sluice pumping station
Tourist information
The Easterling, June 2009 Journal of the East Anglian waterways association, describing the re-opening and giving a detailed history of the waterway and construction of the new lock. 
Black Sluice Internal Drainage Board

Canals in Lincolnshire
Locks of Lincolnshire
Fenland District
Buildings and structures in Boston, Lincolnshire